Nawata and Gawata were the Kings of Kano from 1134 to 1136. They were the twin sons of Gijimasu and Munsada.

Reign
The twin kings ruled jointly over Kano until one of them (the Kano Chronicle did not mention which one of the twins) died 7 months after he ascended the throne. The other twin died in 1136 after ruling alone for 17 months.

Succession
The twin kings were succeeded in 1136 by their brother Yusa, also known as Tsaraki.

Biography in the Kano Chronicle
Below is a biography of Nawata and Gawata from Palmer's 1908 English translation of the Kano Chronicle.

References

12th-century monarchs in Africa
Monarchs of Kano
Male twins
Nigerian twins
1135 deaths
1136 deaths